Toronto, Ontario, Canada's CNAnime was an annual multigenre fan convention that ran within what is now called Fan Expo Canada. It was founded as the Canadian National Anime Expo in 1998 by Hobby Star Marketing Inc. It was traditionally a three-day event (Friday through Sunday) typically held the weekend before Labour Day during the summer in Toronto, Ontario, Canada, at the Metro Toronto Convention Centre.

Originally showcasing anime, the convention had expanded over the years to include a larger range of pop culture elements, such as cosplay, manga, animation, toys, collectible card games, video games and web entertainment. The convention was the largest of its kind in Canada and among the largest in world, filling the entire South building of the Metro Toronto Convention Centre with over 91,000 attendees in 2012. The CNAnime brand has now been retired as the entire event has been folded into Fan Expo Canada.

Along with panels, seminars, and workshops with anime professionals, there were previews of upcoming feature films, and evening events such as The Masquerade; a costume contest, and the Diamond Distribution Industry Night Dinner and reception for industry professionals only. Traditional events included screening rooms devoted to Japanese animation, with over 175 hours of other programming on all aspects of pop culture.

CNAnime ran within Fan Expo Canada and featured a large floorspace for exhibitors. These included media companies such as movie studios and TV networks, as well as anime, toy, and manga dealers with many top collectibles merchants as well. CNAnime/Fan Expo Canada also included a large autograph area, as well as the Artists' Alley where manga artists can sign autographs and sell or do free sketches.

History of CNAnime - locations and dates

Issues

Capacity attendance at CNAnime/Fan Expo Canada in 2005 has raised crowding issues. Concerns have been that the event is possibly too big for the Metro Toronto Convention Centre, even though they have moved to the largest halls in the facility. The worry of some fans is that the event will sell out and potential attendees will be denied entry as has happened at similar events such as the New York Comic Con and San Diego Comic-Con International.

Community

To strengthen its standing in the community, Hobby Star Marketing, the company that organizes CNAnime and Fan Expo Canada, also has worked with local fan organizations, to strengthen relationships. In 2005, the Hobby Star Marketing instituted a policy of free admission to those twelve years old and younger to encourage young people to be exposed to the content, and hopefully become the next generation of fans. Later that year, Hobby Star Marketing surprised many with a goodwill gesture following the failure of a local competing anime convention. After an event called "Con No Baka" failed to materialize in Toronto, Hobby Star Marketing offered to honour tickets to Con No Baka at their event with no charge to the patrons.  Most of this was in response to feedback that the company, were bad corporate citizens, losing touch with the grass roots of fandom.

References

External links
 

Defunct comics conventions
Defunct gaming conventions
Defunct science fiction conventions
Defunct fan conventions
Defunct multigenre conventions
Events in Toronto
Summer events in Canada